These are the Japanese Records in Swimming: they are the fastest times ever swum by a swimmer from Japan in recognized events. The records are kept and maintained by the Japan Swimming Federation (JSF). The JSF recognizes records swum in both long course (50m) and short course (25m) pools.

Long course (50 metres)

Men

|-bgcolor=#DDDDDD
|colspan=9|
|-

|-bgcolor=#DDDDDD
|colspan=9|
|-

|-bgcolor=#DDDDDD
|colspan=9|
|-

|-bgcolor=#DDDDDD
|colspan=9|
|-

|-bgcolor=#DDDDDD
|colspan=9|
|-

Women

Mixed relay

Short course (25 m)

Men

Women

Mixed relay

References
General
Japanese Long Course Records – Men 8 September 2022 updated
Japanese Long Course Records – Women 8 September 2022 updated
Japanese Short Course Records – Men 27 October 2022 updated
Japanese Short Course Records – Women 27 October 2022 updated
Specific

External links 
 Japan Swimming Federation
 JSF records page

Japan
Records
Swimming
Swimming